Legends is the name of a 2005 triple CD compilation album by British pop group Five Star. It was the group's fourth 'Greatest Hits' collection issued by BMG Camden in 2005 as a general release, to celebrate the band's 20 years since their first hit single. The album was issued on CD only.  The 41-track album comprises remastered versions of all 40 tracks from Five Star's first four albums with RCA/BMG (replacing the full version of "Strong as Steel" with the single edit) with the addition of the 1989 Greatest Hits single "With Every Heartbeat", but omitting the only remaining released song from their RCA/BMG catalogue, 1989's "Something about my baby".

Track listing

Disc 1 
 System Addict
 Rain or Shine
 The Slightest Touch
 If I Say Yes
 All Fall Down
 Let Me Be the One
 Can't Wait Another Minute
 Love Take Over
 RSVP
 Whenever You're Ready
 Another Weekend
 Somewhere Somebody
 Rock My World
 Strong as Steel (single version)

Disc 2 
 Find the Time
 Stay Out of My Life
 There's a Brand New World
 Let Me Be Yours
 With Every Heartbeat
 Hide and Seek
 Now I'm In Control
 Say Goodbye
 Crazy
 Winning
 Please Don't Say Goodnight
 Show Me What You've Got for Me
 Are You Man Enough

Disc 3 
 Don't You Know I Love It
 Read Between the Lines
 Live Giving Love
 Ain't Watcha Do
 Made Out of Love
 You Should Have Waited
 Knock Twice
 Hard Race
 Are You Really the One
 Free Time
 Physical Attraction
 Godsend
 Someone's In Love
 Rescue Me

References

Five Star compilation albums
2005 compilation albums